was a Japanese naval officer who became the first prisoner of war of World War II to be captured by U.S. forces.

Early life and education
Sakamaki was born in what is now part of the city of Awa, Tokushima Prefecture, one of eight sons. He was a graduate of the 68th class of the Imperial Japanese Naval Academy in 1940.

Career

Attack on Pearl Harbor

Ensign Sakamaki was one of ten sailors (five officers and five petty officers) selected to attack Pearl Harbor in five two-man Ko-hyoteki class midget submarines on 7 December 1941. Of the ten, nine were killed (including the other crewman in submarine HA. 19, CWO Kiyoshi Inagaki.)  Sakamaki was chosen for the mission due to his large number of siblings.

Sakamaki's submarine became trapped on a reef off Waimanalo Beach, Oahu, as it attempted to enter Pearl Harbor. The book Attack on Pearl Harbor claims that his submarine hit four coral reefs and sank. Sakamaki ordered his crewman, Kiyoshi Inagaki, to swim to shore, and Sakamaki attempted to scuttle the disabled submarine and swim to shore as well. The explosives failed to go off and Inagaki drowned. Sakamaki made it to shore, but fell unconscious once on the beach, where he was found by a U.S. soldier, David Akui, and was taken into military custody. When he awoke, he found himself in a hospital under U.S. armed security. Sakamaki became the first Japanese prisoner of war in U.S. captivity during World War II. Japanese high command struck his name from the records and told his family that he had been killed in action. His submarine was recovered and taken on tours across the United States to encourage war bond purchases.

After being taken to Sand Island, Sakamaki requested that he be allowed to kill himself, which was denied. He spent the rest of the war in prisoner-of-war camps in the continental United States. At the war's end, Sakamaki was repatriated to Japan, by which time he had become deeply committed to pacifism.

Later life and death
Sakamaki married and raised a family. He worked with the Toyota Motor Corporation, becoming president of its Brazilian subsidiary in 1969. In 1983, he returned to Japan and continued working for Toyota before retiring in 1987. Outside of writing a memoir, Sakamaki refused to speak about the war until 1991, when he attended a historical conference at the National Museum of the Pacific War in Fredericksburg, Texas. He reportedly cried at the conference when he was reunited with his submarine (which was on display at the museum) for the first time in 50 years.

He spent the rest of his life in Japan until his death in 1999 at the age of 81.

Publications
 Four Years as a Prisoner-of-War, No. 1 (Japan). Published in the United States as I Attacked Pearl Harbor.

References

Further reading
 
  Sakamaki's experience as a prisoner of war are detailed in the first chapter "Prisoner Number One".

External links

 USS Helm, Report of Pearl Harbor Attack

1918 births
1999 deaths
People from Tokushima Prefecture
Imperial Japanese Navy officers
Imperial Japanese Navy personnel of World War II
World War II prisoners of war held by the United States
Attack on Pearl Harbor
Japanese prisoners of war
Japanese expatriates in Brazil
Toyota people
Japanese pacifists